2 Train can refer to:

 2 (New York City Subway service)
 Orange Line (Montreal Metro)
 Paris Métro Line 2
 Line 2, Beijing Subway
 Line 2, Shanghai Metro
 Line 2, Toronto Subway
 Edward the Blue Engine (Little kids about 4 and under will sometimes call Edward "2 train")

See also
 Line 2 (disambiguation)